Phycologia Australica, written by William Henry Harvey, is one of the most important works on phycology of the 19th century. (Phycology is the study of algae.)

The work, published in five separate volumes between 1858 and 1863, is the result of Harvey’s extensive collecting along the Australian shores during a three year sabbatical. By the time Harvey set foot in Western Australia, he had already established himself as a leading phycologist having published several large works on algae from the British Isles, northern America as well as the Southern Ocean (Nereis Australica). The fact that Harvey travelled the globe on several occasions and collected the seaweeds which he described himself in his later publications, set him apart from most of his contemperoraries who relied for the most part on specimens collected by others. In addition Harvey’s zest for work, made he pressed sometimes over 700 specimens in a single day, which were distributed to his colleagues a set of Australian algae. Upon his return to Trinity College in Dublin, Harvey embarked on a mission: the illustration and description of over 300 species of Australian algae, for which he deserved the title "father of Australian Phycology".

The dedications and specific epithets of the species commemorate his friend George Clifton, of Fremantle, who assisted Harvey as a collector.

References 
 Harvey, W.H. 1858. Phycologia australica Vol. 1. London. Pp. [i]-xi + v-viii [Index], pls. I-LX. 
 Harvey, W.H. 1859. Phycologia australica Vol. 2. London. viii pp., pls. LXI-CXX. 
 Harvey, W.H. 1860. Phycologia australica Vol. 3. London. viii pp., pls. CXXI-CLXXX. 
 Harvey, W.H. 1862. Phycologia australica Vol. 4. London. viii pp., pls. CLXXXI-CCXL. 
 Harvey, W.H. 1863. Phycologia australica Vol. 5. London. Pp. [i]-x + v-lxxiii [Synoptic catalogue], pls. CCXLI-CCC.

External links
Digitized copy of Phycologia australica Vol. 1-5 with metadata connections to the Encyclopedia of Life website at Biodiversity Heritage Library
 Searchable database of Phycologia Australica 

Biology books
1858 non-fiction books
1859 non-fiction books
1860 non-fiction books
1862 non-fiction books
1863 non-fiction books
1858 in science
1859 in science
1860 in science 
1861 in science
1862 in science
1863 in science

Phycology
1850s in science
1860s in science